Bheeshma is a 2020 Indian Telugu-language romantic comedy film written and directed by Venky Kudumula. The film stars Nithiin and Rashmika Mandanna while Anant Nag, Jisshu Sengupta, Vennela Kishore, and Sampath Raj play supporting roles. It is produced by Suryadevara Naga Vamsi under Sithara Entertainments. The music is composed by Mahati Swara Sagar. Upon Release, on 21 February 2020, the film received positive reviews and became a commercial success.

Plot
Bheeshma is the CEO of "Bheeshma Organics", who wants farmers to shift from using chemicals in farming to organic practices and he gets them successfully to shift. Bheeshma then announces to the media that he will announce the next CEO on the company's 50th anniversary.

Meanwhile, Bheeshma Prasad, a single man seeks to find love always, where he attends his friend Parimal's boss's pre-wedding party where he sees Sarah. He introduces himself as Bheeshma I.A.S. (I am Single) and he gets her to elope with her. She then realizes that he does not have money and she gets him stuck with the police which gets Parimal fired. His uncle, JP, has to bail him out by calling his classmate ACP Deva. Deva asks JP to bring Bheeshma to him to teach him a lesson as he believes Bheeshma is a "loser" since he lives his life as a meme creator. JP then tells Bheeshma's father, Anand Prasad, that Bheeshma is serving a punishment with Deva and the flashback is that Anand and Deva were classmates and Bheeshma touched his daughter when they were little causing a split between both of them. 

Bheeshma starts off by cleaning and serving tea to the officers. One day, Bheeshma is driving and after he drops off Deva, on the way back he sees that Chaitra needs assistance as her vehicle got into a crash. He introduces to her as ACP Bheeshma as he is in a police vehicle and she introduces herself as an employee of Bheeshma Organics. He decides to go with her and he ends up learning about organic farming. Raghavan, the CEO of Field Science, introduces a product called "Instant" which produces a six-month yield in four months by the use of chemicals and tries to influence some of Bheeshma's farmers by setting up a live interaction with Bheeshma. After a few hilarious twists and turns, Bheeshma finds out that Chaitra is the daughter of Deva. Deva soon develops a good opinion about Bheeshma but Chaitra does not like him. Bheeshma works for Deva as a driver and takes Chaitra to places where she wants to go. 

Chaitra and Bheeshma go to the interaction and he finds his friend Parimal there and that he works for Field Science. Bheeshma talks about how great organic farming is during the interaction and wins over Chaitra. Suddenly, Deva's constable sends a picture of them hugging and Deva is angry. He goes to Bheeshma's house and is shocked to see Anand as his father. He takes out his gun and decides to shoot Bheeshma saying he is a loser when Anand reveals that Bheeshma is the grandson of Sr. Bheeshma and he is the next CEO of Bheeshma Organics. Deva and Bheeshma are shocked and the media learns about this. When Bheeshma is ready to leave to take care of his grandfather, it is revealed that Anand lied to Deva to try to keep his son alive. Bheeshma is shocked and in the meanwhile, Chaitra calls him saying that her father wants her to marry him since he is the grandson of Sr. Bheeshma and says that he is a liar and that he manipulated her and how she knows that he is not Bheeshma's grandson. 

Bheeshma decides to tell Deva the truth but to his surprise Sr. Bheeshma announces him as an operational CEO of the company for 30 days. Bheeshma is shocked by this decision and Chaitra despises him even more. He also found out that Parimal lost his job at Field Science due to Raghavan learning that Parimal is Bheeshma's friend and he joins as a driver for Bheeshma. Bheeshma is then shown around the office and he quickly wins over the employees. He also saves a village from signing from Field Science enraging Raghavan and also rewins Chaitra's love. Raghavan decides to make sure Bheeshma is not the next CEO by giving a poisonous hybrid plant to Sr. Bheeshma which then hospitalizes him and to become India's #1 agricultural company and also plants chemically made plants in Bheeshma's warehouse to further make the company lose reputation with a police raid. 

Raghavan invites Agricultural Minister Ajay Varma, to launch Instant to the world but to his surprise, Ajay says that the product is made of harmful chemicals and cancels the license of Field Science which confines Raghavan to the hospital. He soon finds out that Sr. Bheeshma is alive and he was only hospitalized due to a high fever. The plant which Raghavan sent was destroyed by Parimal, thinking that the plant was for Jr. Bheeshma when it was actually for Sr. Bheeshma. Jr. Bheeshma then just suggests Parimal to replace the plant with a similar looking plant without the poisonous properties. Bheeshma also reveals that he found Sarah and Ajay in a hotel room and had blackmailed to telecast their relationship to the public in exchange for Ajay to provide a speech about how the chemicals are bad and the police found out about him planting the plants. Bheeshma is then appointed as the full-time CEO of Bheeshma Organics where Chaitra and Bheeshma finally marry.

Cast 

Nithiin as Bheeshma "Bheeshma Jr." Prasad
Rashmika Mandanna as Chaitra, Bheeshma Jr's love interest
Anant Nag as Bheeshma Sr., CEO of Bheeshma Organics
Jisshu Sengupta as Raghavan, a scientist and CEO of Field science (Voice dubbed by Hemachandra)
Vennela Kishore as Parimal, Bheeshma Prasad's friend turned arch-enemy
Sampath Raj as Deva, Chaitra's father and Assistant Commissioner of Police
Ajay as Ajay Varma, Agricultural Minister and Sarah's boyfriend
Naresh as Anand Prasad, Bheeshma Jr.'s father and Deva's friend
Praveena as Deepa, Bheeshma Jr.'s mother
Brahmaji as JP, Deva and Anand Prasad's friend, a journalist
Mime Gopi as Purushottam, Sarpanch of Singannapalem
Kalyani Natarajan as Kalyani, Deva's wife and Chaitra's mother
Raghu Babu as Balram, an employee of Bheeshma Organics
Subhalekha Sudhakar as Ramaraju, Bheeshma sr's friend
Sathyan as Parimal's boss and Sarah's husband
Satya as Uber driver
Shivakumar Ramachandravarapu as Shiva
Appaji Ambarisha Darbha as Sr Bheeshma's PA
Rajiv Kumar Aneja as Pandey ji
Narra Srinivas as Raghavan's elder brother
Sudharshan as Employee
Hebah Patel as Sarah
Avantika Mishra as herself in the song "Singles Anthem"
Kalaplatha as a maid at Bheeshma's house

Production 
The film was announced on 30 March 2019, by Rashmika Mandanna through social media platforms, coinciding with Nithiin's birthday. The pooja ceremony and the principal photography was done in mid May 2019. Filming was lasted until late December 2019. Kannada actor Anant Nag was signed to play a pivotal role while, Bengali actor Jisshu Sengupta was signed to portray the antagonist. The song "Hey Choosa" was shot in Positano, Italy.

Release

The film initially aimed at 25 December 2019, but was released on 21 February 2020.

Home media 
The film was released on Netflix and Sun NXT (along with dubbed versions in Tamil, Kannada and Malayalam) on 9 April 2020 with English Subtitles. The Hindi dubbed version was directly premiered on Dhinchaak TV channel (now renamed to Goldmines) on 19 February 2022.

Soundtrack 

The music was composed by Mahati Swara Sagar.

Reception

Critical response 
The film opened to positive reviews from critics on the first day of its release with praise for its performances, comedy, songs and dance numbers.

Sangeetha Devi Dundoo of The Hindu, appreciated the film's use of humour and wrote: "Director Venky Kudumula places such a character in the centre of a farming war. The result is a partly farcical comedy that’s at times deliberately frustrating and at other times, lends itself to laugh aloud segments." Australian Stars rated it 4/5 "A great entertainer, The whole cast was amazing and Venky's movie is all the way a winner. This is your perfect weekend watch." Koimoi.com editor Rohit Mohan rated the film 3/5 and stated "Nithiin comeback after one and half years is totally natural and a smash hit. The movie strikes right to the audience and Jishu Sengupta , Rashmika Mandanna did complete justice to their role." Times of India editor rated 3/5 star and stated "If you loved Chalo, giving Bheeshma a chance is a no-brainer (pun intended). Just don’t go expecting something even remotely sane or novel and you won’t be disappointed."

Box office
In the overseas the film has collected a gross of $684,000 on its first weekend.

Accolades

Notes

References

External links 
 

2020s Telugu-language films
2020 films
Films shot in Hyderabad, India
2020s masala films
Indian romantic comedy films
2020 romantic comedy films